Zoloty Potik castle is an architectural landmark of Polish and Ukrainian national significance in Ternopil Oblast, Western Ukraine built under the Polish rule between the 16th and 17th centuries nearby the urban-type settlement of Złoty Potok (now Zolotyi Potik).

History

The Voivode of Bracław and a wealthy Polish nobleman Stefan Potocki and his spouse, Maria Amalia Mohylanka, funded the castle construction at the turn of 16th to 17th centuries to the order of the Polish King Sigismund III Vasa. At the end of 18th century it was a residence of Jan Potocki’s family, who was the founders' son and its owner. The castle had been serving as his headquarter on the verge of Turk-Tatar inroad and following its destruction on September 1676.

In 1672 Turkish-Tatar armed forces under the command of sultan Mohamed IV captured the castle in the course of two days combat. Embattled troops gave up their positions.

On September 4 or 5th of 1676 Turkish-Tatar army commanded by Ibrahim Pasha seized the castle by exploding main bearing wall. Stronghold defenders all together with people sheltered inside fiercely resisted the assault and having been defeated in the aftermath were executed had their throats slashed. The Castle was burnt, fringe and entrance towers sustained most of the damage.

Guardians of then under aged Stefan Aleksander Potocki, castle’s owner, partially restored the enceinte on having Turks retreated. Rebuilding completed on the brink of the 18th century.

When the first subdivision of Poland occurs in 1772, Złoty Potok governing transitioned to Habsburg Austria. Around the year of 1840 therein castle owner, Olszewski, reconstructed the castle into the palace by design of Italian architect in the course of which part of the bulwark been destroyed and all the fine architectural details of masonry as baluster, baroque windows and doors trimming unscrupulously eradicated. On work having been completed, stone building appeared to be one story containing gin shop, Classic principal facade, and Victorian Gothic back yard and flank facades. Lime-trees were planted in the yard and some sculpture work installed. Walking into the enceinte one could find under the feet a bas-relief portrait of Polish poet and writer Adam Mickiewicz.

Inheritance timeline 
There is a long row of people that have left their impression on the castle existence.

Architectural snapshots 

Złoty Potok (now Zolotyy Potik) Castle preserved well even though remained in desolation and partial ruination. This historic landmark positioned at the city's central headquarters nearby a rivulet falling into Złoty Potok pond. The villagers' residences located next to the stronghold bulwark. The castle has regular features and shaped in the form of rectangular. It was built out of local field stone of granite and auburn color. The midsection of south north curtain wall contains a gate house being the style of Late Renaissance. Originally castle was of one story tall. The second story was added later. On the inside the gate ornamented with hereditary insignia of Potocki family, Piława.

Some sources inform that castle was inhabited at the end of 18th century. The western part of the castle yard housed a water well eliminated later in 19th century.

References 

  Створено графічну реконструкцію зовнішнього вигляду зруйнованих замків Західної України 

Castles in Ukraine
Castles in Ternopil Oblast
Zolotyi Potik
Houses completed in 1631
1631 establishments in the Polish–Lithuanian Commonwealth